Henry Gracely Klinefelter (October 22, 1843March 22, 1910) was an American farmer and Republican politician.  He served one term in the Wisconsin State Assembly, representing Dane County.

Biography

Born in Marion County, Ohio, Klinefelter went to Mukwonago High School in Mukwonago, Wisconsin. In 1846, Klinefelter settled in the community of Nora, in the town of Cottage Grove, Dane County, Wisconsin Territory. Klinefelter was a farmer and tobacco buyer. During the American Civil War, Klinefelter served in Company D of the 7th Wisconsin Infantry Regiment, a part of the famous Iron Brigade, eventually being promoted to Second Lieutenant of the 51st Wisconsin Volunteer Infantry Regiment shortly before the end of the war. After the death of his first wife, Lydia Hoffman Klinefelter (1849–1871), Klinefelter married Frances A. Devoe (1849–1919) in 1872. Klinefelter served as justice of the peace and a census enumerator, and was a Republican. In 1889, Klinefelter served in the Wisconsin State Assembly. He died in Madison, Wisconsin.

References

External links

1843 births
1910 deaths
People from Cottage Grove, Wisconsin
People from Marion County, Ohio
People of Wisconsin in the American Civil War
Union Army officers
Union Army soldiers
Farmers from Wisconsin
19th-century American politicians
Burials in Wisconsin
Republican Party members of the Wisconsin State Assembly